His Tiger Lady is a 1928 American silent drama film directed by Hobart Henley and written by Herman J. Mankiewicz, Alfred Savoir and Ernest Vajda. The film stars Adolphe Menjou, Evelyn Brent, Rose Dione, Émile Chautard, Mario Carillo and Leonardo De Vesa. The film was released on May 27, 1928, by Paramount Pictures.

Cast
Adolphe Menjou as Henri
Evelyn Brent as The Tiger Lady
Rose Dione	as Madame Duval
Émile Chautard as Stage Manager
Mario Carillo as The Duke
Leonardo De Vesa as The Count
Jules Raucourt as The Marquis

References

External links

1928 films
1920s English-language films
Silent American drama films
1928 drama films
Paramount Pictures films
Films directed by Hobart Henley
American black-and-white films
Films with screenplays by Herman J. Mankiewicz
American films based on plays
American silent feature films
1920s American films